James (Jim) Keith Bain   (1929-) is a former company director, farmer, and author. He was chairman of W. Bain & Co. (1947–87), Merryville Estates Pty Ltd, Sydney Stock Exchange Ltd (1983–87) and the NatWest Aust. Bank Ltd (1985–91).

He attended both The Armidale School and Scots College.

Bain retired as a senior partner of Bain & Company in 1986–7, and a few years later (1992) it was acquired by Deutsche Bank; Jim Bain was a grandson of the founder. In retirement, he wrote about his experiences in the Australian financial industry.

Works

References

Australian stockbrokers
1929 births
Living people
Members of the Order of Australia